Eshaqvand-e Olya (also Romanized as Esḩāqvand-e ‘Olyā; also known as ‘Īsá Khān Bālā and ‘Īsá Khān-e ‘Olyā) is a village in Cheshmeh Kabud Rural District, in the Central District of Harsin County, Kermanshah Province, Iran. At the 2006 census, its population was 161, in 28 families.

References 

Populated places in Harsin County